Marshall High School is a public high school in Bend, Oregon, United States.

References

High schools in Deschutes County, Oregon
Education in Bend, Oregon
Public high schools in Oregon